The Journal of Personality and Social Psychology is a monthly peer-reviewed scientific journal published by the American Psychological Association that was established in 1965. It covers the fields of social and personality psychology. The editors-in-chief are Shinobu Kitayama (University of Michigan; Attitudes and Social Cognition Section), Colin Wayne Leach (Barnard College; Interpersonal Relations and Group Processes Section), and Richard E. Lucas (Michigan State University; Personality Processes and Individual Differences Section).

The journal has implemented the Transparency and Openness Promotion (TOP) Guidelines.  The TOP Guidelines provide structure to research planning and reporting and aim to make research more transparent, accessible, and reproducible.

Contents 
The journal's focus is on empirical research reports; however, specialized theoretical, methodological, and review papers are also published. For example, the journal's most highly cited paper, cited over 90,000 times, is a statistical methods paper discussing mediation and moderation.

Articles typically involve a lengthy introduction and literature review, followed by several related studies that explore different aspects of a theory or test multiple competing hypotheses. Some researchers see the multiple-experiments requirement as an excessive burden that delays the publication of valuable work, but this requirement also helps maintain the impression that research that is published in JPSP has been thoroughly vetted and is less likely to be the result of a type I error or an unexplored confound.

The journal is divided into three independently edited sections. Attitudes and Social Cognition addresses those domains of social behavior in which cognition plays a major role, including the interface of cognition with overt behavior, affect, and motivation. Interpersonal Relations and Group Processes focuses on psychological and structural features of interaction in dyads and groups. Personality Processes and Individual Differences publishes research on all aspects of personality psychology. It includes studies of individual differences and basic processes in behavior, emotions, coping, health, motivation, and other phenomena that reflect personality.

Abstracting and indexing 
The journal is abstracted and indexed in:

According to the Journal Citation Reports, the journal has a 2020 impact factor of 7.673.

Replicability 

JPSP is one of the journals analyzed in the Open Science Collaboration's Reproducibility Project after JPSP's publication of questionable research for mental time travel (Bem, 2011).  (See replication crisis and "Feeling the Future" controversy).

The journal refused to publish refuting replications performed by Ritchie's team, in relation to an earlier article they published in 2010 that suggested that psychic abilities may have been involved (backward causality).

In popular culture 
Non-fiction author Malcolm Gladwell writes frequently about findings that are reported in the journal. Gladwell, upon being asked where he would like to be buried, replied "I'd like to be buried in the current-periodicals room, maybe next to the unbound volumes of the Journal of Personality and Social Psychology (my favorite journal)."

References

External links 
 

Social psychology journals
Personality journals
Publications established in 1965
English-language journals
Monthly journals
American Psychological Association academic journals
Differential psychology journals